The Mosque of Rome, situated in  Parioli, Rome, Italy, is the largest mosque in the Western world in terms of land area.
The building is located in the Acqua Acetosa area, at the foot of the Monti Parioli, north of the city. It is also the seat of the Italian Islamic Cultural Centre.

In addition to being a meeting place for religious activities, it provides cultural and social services variously connecting Muslims together. It also holds teachings, wedding ceremonies, funeral services, exegesis, exhibitions, conventions, and other events, despite being located in an area with relatively few Muslims.

Construction
The mosque was jointly founded by the exiled Prince Muhammad Hasan of Afghanistan and his wife, Princess Razia and was financed by Faisal of Saudi Arabia, head of the Saudi royal family and Custodian of the Two Holy Mosques as well as by some other states of the Muslim world, including Bangladesh ruled by President Hussain Muhammad Ershad. The project was designed and directed by Paolo Portoghesi, Vittorio Gigliotti and Sami Mousawi. The opening ceremony was led by Pope John Paul II.

Its planning took more than ten years: the Roman City Council donated the land in 1974, but the first stone was laid only in 1984, in the presence of then President of the Italian Republic Sandro Pertini, with its inauguration on 21 June 1995.

There was some opposition to the building of a mosque but much of this dissipated when Pope John Paul II gave his blessing for the project. One issue that had to be agreed was the height of the minaret and its effect on the Rome skyline.

Architecture

The structure is intended to be integrated into the surrounding green area, with a mix of modern structural design and omnipresent curves. Lights and shades are blended in a manner intended to create a meditative climate, and the choice of materials, like travertino and cotto, evoke traditional Roman architectural styles. The interior decor is mainly made of glazed tiles with light colors, with the recurrent Qur'anic theme "God is Light", which has been subject of controversy.

The interiors are decorated with mosaics creating more optical effects and the floor is covered by a Persian carpet with geometrical patterns as well. The main prayer area can accommodate up to 2,500 worshipers. Above this are galleries that are reserved for female worshipers. The complex also includes an educational area with classroom and a library, a conference centre with a large auditorium, and an area where exhibitions are held.

The outcome is an architecture made of repetitious designs and geometric patterns, where an important role is played by the light aimed to create a meditative atmosphere and various tricks of light as well.

The mosque contains several palm-shaped columns, which represent the connection between God and the single devotee.

Design of Mosque 

The construction of the Mosque of Rome played a vital part during the 1990s as the religion had compounded throughout the world. Its growth to the western section of the world was one of the reasons the mosque was built in the first place. An abundance of Muslims in Rome and countries surrounding it had finally received a holy sanctuary. The design of the mosque is precise as it holds nearly 2,500 people in the prayer area. Architects Paolo and Sami decided to add another small private prayer room holding up to 150 worshippers. They would proceed to add classrooms/libraries for educational purposes as well as an auditorium for important conferences regarding business/events for the mosque. To top all of this included in the Mosque are two residential complex's, one in which is for the Imam to live and the other for visitors coming to live the experience of the largest mosque in Europe. While designing the mosque, its construction was split into two parts one being the prayer hall which is if not the most important room in the building and the other part fulfils all the other functions from mosque (classrooms, auditorium, wudu area, etc.) The second part of the mosque was built underneath the prayer hall and resembles an "H" shape. For the women in this mosque, they have their own prayer section which is about a one-fourth of men's prayer hall and is also below them downstairs.

Finance of Mosque 
The cost of the mosque ranges from 40 to 50 million euros after all construction/material wages. The estate in which the mosque is located was granted by the city in Rome. Other Muslim countries played a vital role in terms of moral support and helped financed the mosque itself. Moroccan and Turkish government stepped in taking incentive constructing the main prayer hall along with the small prayer section located downstairs. Algeria, the United Arab Emirates, Bahrain, Bangladesh, Brunei, Egypt, Indonesia, Iraq, Jordan, Kuwait, Libya, Malaysia, Mauritania, Oman, Pakistan, Qatar, Saudi Arabia, Senegal, Sudan, Tunisia, and Yemen. All these countries above were contributors to making the largest mosque in Europe with Saudi Arabia being the front-runner making major contributions of nearly 20 million euros.

Organization

The current Imam of the mosque is the Sheikh Salah Ramadan Elsayed, Al-Azhar University graduate and former Democratic Party. Former Deputy Khalid Chaouki was president of the Cultural Centre between 2017 and 2019. Former Imams include:
 1983–1993: Muhammad Nur al-Din Isma'il
 1993–2006: Mahmud Hammad Shwayta
 2007–2010: Ala' al-Din Muhammad Isma'il al-Ghobashi
 2010–2013: Ahmed Al-Saqqa
 2013–2016: Muhammad Hassan Abdulghaffar

See also

Islam in Italy

References

Further reading

External links

 Mosque of Rome  at the Facebook

1994 establishments in Italy
Mosques completed in 1994
Religious buildings and structures in Rome
Mosque buildings with domes
Rome
Rome Q. II Parioli